Equity Music Group was an American country music record label founded in 2003 by singer Clint Black. The label was distributed by Koch Entertainment (now E1 Entertainment).

The name "Equity" was chosen to represent the equality between the artist and the label. According to Equity, "The artists will own what they create and get paid from the first scanned sale. In turn, the label has a vested interest in other aspects of the artist's career." The label closed in December 2008 due to financial difficulties.

Artist roster 
The following acts were signed to Equity Music Group:
Clint Black
Laura Bryna
Carolina Rain
Kevin Fowler
Carolyn Dawn Johnson
Shannon Lawson
Little Big Town
Mark Wills
Blake Wise

References

American country music record labels
Record labels established in 2003
Record labels disestablished in 2008
American independent record labels
Defunct record labels of the United States